Standings and results for Group 2 of the UEFA Euro 1980 qualifying tournament.

Group 2 consisted of Austria, Belgium, Norway, Portugal and Scotland. Group winners were Belgium, who went undefeated in qualifying, edging past Austria.

Final table

Results

Goalscorers

References
 

Group 2
1978–79 in Scottish football
1979–80 in Scottish football
1978–79 in Belgian football
Qual
1978–79 in Austrian football
1979–80 in Austrian football
1978–79 in Portuguese football
1979–80 in Portuguese football
1978 in Norwegian football
1979 in Norwegian football